Speed skating at the 2017 Winter Universiade was held at the Medeu High Mountain Ice Rink from 31 January to 6 February 2017.

Medal table

Men's events

Women's events

References

External links
Speed skating at the 2017 Winter Universiade.
Results book

 
Speed skating
Winter Universiade
2017